Modern Chinese Literature and Culture, formerly Modern Chinese Literature (1984–1998), is a peer-reviewed academic journal covering the culture of modern and contemporary China, with China understood not in a narrow, political sense (e.g., People's Republic of China), but in the sense of Greater China (e.g. PRC, Hong Kong, Taiwan, and the Chinese diaspora). The journal publishes two issues per year covering literature of all genres, film and television, popular culture, performance and visual art, print and material culture, etc. 

In 2021, Natascha Gentz and Christopher Rosenmeier became editors-in-chief, taking over from Kirk A. Denton. Publication of the journal was moved to Edinburgh University Press. The journal is abstracted and indexed in the Arts and Humanities Citation Index, and issues appear on JSTOR following an embargo period. The publisher also offers electronic access to subscribers for issues from 2022 onward. 

Book reviews have not appeared in the print journal since 2003. They are instead published on the MCLC Resource Center, a website on modern China cultural studies that is affiliated with the journal. The MCLC Resource Center maintains a literature database and also publishes translations, interviews, bibliographies, and articles with a strong multimedia component. The journal publishes occasional special issues.

External links
 MCLC website
 Edinburgh University Press website
 MCLC Resource Center
 

Chinese culture
Chinese literature
Chinese studies journals
Cultural journals
Publications established in 1984
English-language journals
Biannual journals